Triangel may refer to:

 Sassenburg-Triangel, a village near Gifhorn, Lower Saxony, Germany
 Triangel (vehicle manufacturer), a Danish vehicle manufacturer
 A misspelling of triangle, the geometric shape
 German for Triangle (musical instrument)